Panaeolus microsporus is a species of mushroom in the Bolbitiaceae family. It is a psychoactive species of the Panaeolus genus, containing alkaloids like psilocybin and psilosin. All Panaeolus species produce serotonin and serotonin derivatives.

Characteristics 
Like all Panaeolus species, they form small mushrooms with black spores and mottled gills. The gills form spots from the uneven maturation of the spores.

Habitat & Distribution 
P. microsporus is found growing on dung. Their distribution has been noted within the Central African Republic.

Neurological effects 
Psilocybin has a chemical structure similar to that of serotonin, a neurotransmitter involved in mood regulation, concentration, and sleep. Psilocybin's structure is likely the reason for its effects on serotonin receptors which can impact mood and cause difficulty concentrating, restlessness, and hallucinations.

Legality 
Throughout the world, the legality of psilocybin containing mushrooms varies. Under the United Nations 1971 Convention on Psychotropic Substances, psilocybin is listed as a Schedule I substance in the US, and a Class A drug in the UK. Therefore, the possession and consumption of psilocybin-containing mushrooms is prohibited by federal law. Local and state laws may vary.

See also
Psilocybin mushrooms
Psilocybe
Baeocystin

References

microsporus